The following lists the number one singles on the Australian Singles Chart, along with other substantial hits, during the 1990s. The source for this decade is the ARIA Charts.

1990

Top 5 singles by Australian and New Zealand artists
 "Better the Devil You Know" – Kylie Minogue
 "Mona" – Craig McLachlan and Check 1–2
 "I Need Your Body" – Tina Arena
 "Crying in the Chapel" – Peter Blakeley
 "Lay Down Your Guns" – Jimmy Barnes
 "Show No Mercy" – Mark Williams

Other hits
Songs which peaked at number two included "I Feel the Earth Move" by Martika, "I Want That Man" by Deborah Harry, "Ride On Time" by Black Box, "Don't Know Much" by Linda Ronstadt featuring Aaron Neville, "How Am I Supposed to Live Without You" by Michael Bolton, "Hold On" by Wilson Phillips, "Joey" by Concrete Blonde, "Close to You" by Maxi Priest, and "Suicide Blonde" by INXS.

Songs which peaked at number three were "Crying in the Chapel" by Peter Blakeley, "Black Velvet" by Alannah Myles, "Girl I'm Gonna Miss You" by Milli Vanilli, "How Can We Be Lovers?" by Michael Bolton, "Mona" by Craig McLachlan & Check 1–2, "I Need Your Body" by Tina Arena, "Doin' the Do" by Betty Boo, and "Show Me Heaven" by Maria McKee.

Other major hits (with their peak positions noted) included "Lay Down Your Guns" (4) by Jimmy Barnes, "I Don't Want to Be with Nobody but You" (4) by Absent Friends, "Pump Up the Jam" (4) by Technotronic featuring Felly, "Love and Kisses" (4) by Dannii Minogue, "Justify My Love" (4) by Madonna, "Lambada" (5) by Kaoma, "Chain Reaction" (6) by John Farnham, "Summer Rain" (6) by Belinda Carlisle, "Sacrifice" (7) by Elton John, "Hanky Panky" (6) by Madonna, "Blue Sky Mine" (8) by Midnight Oil, "Step by Step" (8) by New Kids on the Block and "Vision of Love" (9) by Mariah Carey.

1991

Top 5 singles by Australian and New Zealand artists
 Tingles (EP) – Ratcat
 "The Horses" – Daryl Braithwaite
 "Read My Lips" – Melissa
 "I Touch Myself" – Divinyls
 "Better" – The Screaming Jets

Other hits
Songs which peaked at number two included "Sadeness (Part I)" by Enigma, "Rhythm of My Heart" by Rod Stewart, "Rush Rush" by Paula Abdul, "Unforgettable" by Natalie Cole and Nat King Cole, "More Than Words" by Extreme, and "Break in the Weather" by Jenny Morris.

Songs which peaked at number three were "Fantasy" by Black Box, "Gonna Make You Sweat (Everybody Dance Now)" by C+C Music Factory, "Wiggle It" by 2 in a Room, "How to Dance" by Bingoboys featuring Princessa, "3 a.m. Eternal" by The KLF, "You Could Be Mine" by Guns N' Roses, "Here I Am (Come and Take Me)" by UB40, "Sexy (Is the Word)" by Melissa, "When Something Is Wrong with My Baby" by John Farnham and Jimmy Barnes, and "Mysterious Ways" by U2.

Other major hits (with peak positions shown), included "Better" (4) by The Screaming Jets, "The Shoop Shoop Song (It's in His Kiss)" (4) by Cher, "I Wanna Sex You Up" (4) by Color Me Badd, "I've Got To Go Now" (5) by Toni Childs, "Ain't No Sunshine" (5) by the Rockmelons featuring Deni Hines, "Burn for You" (5) by John Farnham, "Black Cat" (6) by Janet Jackson, "When Your Love Is Gone" (7) by Jimmy Barnes, "Set Adrift on Memory Bliss" (7) by P.M. Dawn, "From a Distance" (8) by Bette Midler, "Can't Stop This Thing We Started" (9) by Bryan Adams, "Where the Streets Have No Name (I Can't Take My Eyes off You)" (9) by the Pet Shop Boys, "Crazy" (9) by Seal, "It Ain't Over 'til It's Over" (10) by Lenny Kravitz, "Treaty" (11) by Yothu Yindi,  "Where Are You Now?" (13) by Roxus.

1992

Top 5 singles by Australian and New Zealand artists
 "The Day You Went Away" by Wendy Matthews
 "Take It from Me" – Girlfriend
 "Ordinary Angels" (Clunk (EP)) – Frente!
 "Way Out West" – James Blundell and James Reyne
 "Love You Right" – Euphoria

Other hits
Songs which peaked at number two included "Cream" by Prince and The New Power Generation, "Rocket Man" by Kate Bush, "Get Ready for This" by 2 Unlimited, "Way Out West" by James Blundell and James Reyne, "Please Don't Go" by KWS, "Life Is a Highway" by Tom Cochrane, "The Best Things in Life Are Free" by Janet Jackson and Luther Vandross, and "The Day You Went Away" by Wendy Matthews.

Songs which peaked at number three were "Don't Let the Sun Go Down on Me" by Elton John and George Michael, "Justified & Ancient (Stand by The JAMs)" by The KLF, "Dizzy" by Vic Reeves and The Wonder Stuff, "Stay" by Shakespears Sister, Clunk (EP) by Frente!, "Too Funky" by George Michael, "Rhythm Is a Dancer" by Snap!, "Love Is in the Air" by John Paul Young, and "Would I Lie to You?" by Charles & Eddie.

Other major hits (with their peak positions noted) included As Ugly as They Wanna Be (EP) (4) by Ugly Kid Joe, "That Word (L.O.V.E.)" (4) by the Rockmelons featuring Deni Hines, "Erotica" (4) by Madonna, "November Rain" (5) by Guns N' Roses, "Smells Like Teen Spirit" (5) by Nirvana, "Cry" (5) by Lisa Edwards, "In the Closet" (5) and "Remember the Time" (6) by Michael Jackson, "Not a Day Goes By" (5) and "Heaven Knows" (6) by Rick Price, "Everything's Alright" (6) by John Farnham, Kate Ceberano and Jon Stevens, "Be My Baby" (6) by Teen Queens, "Damn I Wish I Was Your Lover" (7) by Sophie B. Hawkins, "I Can Feel It" (7) by Radio Freedom, "Gett Off" (8) by Prince and The New Power Generation and "This Used to Be My Playground" (9) by Madonna.

1993

Top 5 singles by Australian and New Zealand artists
 "Gimme Little Sign" – Peter Andre
 "Stone Cold" – Jimmy Barnes
 "This Is It" – Dannii Minogue
 "You Were There" – Southern Sons
 " Kelly Street" – Frente!

Other hits
Songs which peaked at number two were "Can't Get Enough of Your Love" by Taylor Dayne, "Sweat (A La La La La Long)" by Inner Circle, "What's Up?" by 4 Non Blondes, and "Dreams" by Gabrielle.

Songs which peaked at number 3 were "How Do You Talk to an Angel" by The Heights, "December 1963 (Oh, What a Night)" (Remix) by Frankie Valli and the Four Seasons, "You Ain't Thinking (About Me)" by Sonia Dada, "Gimme Little Sign" by Peter Andre, "Two Princes" by Spin Doctors, "Freak Me" by Silk, and "If I Can't Have You" by Kim Wilde.

Other major hits (with peak positions noted) included "Accidently Kelly Street" (4) by Frente!, "House of Love" (4) by East 17, "Give In to Me" (4) by Michael Jackson, "Dreams" (4) by Gabrielle, "The Key: The Secret" (4) by Urban Cookie Collective, "Would I Lie to You?" (4) by Charles & Eddie, "Oh Carolina" (4) by Shaggy, "Rain" (5) by Madonna, "Sexy MF" (5) and "My Name Is Prince" (9) by Prince and The New Power Generation, "The Floor" (5) by Johnny Gill, "Creep" (6) by Radiohead, "Everybody Hurts" (6) by R.E.M., "Dreamlover" (7) by Mariah Carey, "Believe" (8) by Lenny Kravitz and "Go West" (10) by the Pet Shop Boys.

Hits by Australasian artists also included "The Weight" (6) by Jimmy Barnes and The Badloves, "I Want You" (10) and "In Your Room" (10) both by Toni Pearen, "You're So Vain" (11) by Chocolate Starfish and "Funky Junky" (13) by Peter Andre.

1994

Top 5 singles by Australian and New Zealand artists
 "Tomorrow" – Silverchair
 "Confide in Me" – Kylie Minogue
 "Chains" – Tina Arena
 "Mountain" – Chocolate Starfish
 "Lonely"/"Bizarre Love Triangle" – Frente!

Other hits
Songs which peaked at number two were "Shoop" by Salt-N-Pepa, "Asshole" by Denis Leary, "Slave to the Music" by Twenty 4 Seven, "Said I Loved You...But I Lied" by Michael Bolton, "Whatta Man" by Salt-N-Pepa with En Vogue, "Breathe Again" by Toni Braxton, "Right in the Night (Fall in Love with Music)" by Jam & Spoon featuring Plavka, "Absolutely Fabulous" by Absolutely Fabulous (Pet Shop Boys), "100% Pure Love" by Crystal Waters, "Endless Love" by Mariah Carey and Luther Vandross, "Always" by Bon Jovi, and "All I Want for Christmas Is You" by Mariah Carey.

Songs which peaked at number three were "Without You" by Mariah Carey, "Stay" by Eternal, "Swamp Thing" by The Grid, "7 Seconds" by Youssou N'Dour and Neneh Cherry, "Closer" by Nine Inch Nails, and "Spin the Black Circle" by Pearl Jam.

Other major hits (with peak positions noted) included "Chains" (4) by Tina Arena, "Streets of Philadelphia" (4) by Bruce Springsteen, "Closer" (4) by Nine Inch Nails, "Doop" (4) by Doop, "Around the World" (4) by East 17, "Secret" (5) by Madonna, "Moving on Up" (5) by M People, "Stay (I Missed You)" (5) by Lisa Loeb, "One" (live) (5) by Metallica, "On Bended Knee" (7) by Boyz II Men, "I'll Remember" (7) by Madonna, "Come Out and Play" (8) by The Offspring, "Can You Feel the Love Tonight" (9) by Elton John and "Things Can Only Get Better" (9) by D:Ream.

Hits by Australasian artists also included "Hands Out of My Pocket" (9) by Cold Chisel, "The Winner Is..." (9) by Southend with Nik Fish and "More Wine Waiter Please" (10) by The Poor.

1995

Top 5 singles by Australian and New Zealand artists
 "Mouth" – Merril Bainbridge
 "Let's Groove" – CDB
 "Tomorrow" – Silverchair
 "Mysterious Girl" – Peter Andre
 "Under the Water" – Merril Bainbridge

Other hits
Songs which peaked at number two were "Pure Massacre" by Silverchair, "Here Comes the Hotstepper" by Ini Kamoze, "Total Eclipse of the Heart" by Nicki French, "Think Twice" by Celine Dion, "Scream" by Michael Jackson and Janet Jackson, "Excalibur" by F.C.B., "Alice, Who the Fuck Is Alice?" by The Steppers, "Where the Wild Roses Grow" by Nick Cave and the Bad Seeds and Kylie Minogue, "Let's Groove" by CDB, and Merkin Ball ("I Got Id") by Pearl Jam.

Songs which peaked at number three were "Stay Another Day" by East 17, "Sukiyaki" by 4 P.M., "Strong Enough" by Sheryl Crow, and "Shy Guy" by Diana King.

Other major hits (with peak positions noted) included "Waterfalls" (4) by TLC, "You Oughta Know" (4) by Alanis Morissette, "Short Dick Man" (4) by 20 Fingers featuring Gillette, "This Ain't a Love Song" (4) by Bon Jovi, "Under the Water" (4) by Merril Bainbridge, "It's Alright" (4) by Deni Hines, "Somebody's Crying" (5) by Chris Isaak, "Don't Stop (Wiggle Wiggle)" (5) by The Outhere Brothers, "Ode to My Family" (5) by The Cranberries, "Bedtime Story" (5) by Madonna, "Self Esteem" (6) by The Offspring, "A Girl Like You" (6) by Edwyn Collins, "You Are Not Alone" (7) by Michael Jackson, "When I Come Around" (7) by Green Day, "As I Lay Me Down" (7) by Sophie B. Hawkins, "Runaway" (8) by Janet Jackson, "Cotton Eye Joe" (8) by Rednex, "Baby Did a Bad, Bad Thing" (9) by Chris Isaak and "You'll See" (9) by Madonna.

Hits by Australasian artists also included "Sorrento Moon (I Remember)" (7) by Tina Arena and "Put Yourself in My Place" (11) by Kylie Minogue.

1996

Top 5 singles by Australian and New Zealand artists
 "How Bizarre" – OMC
 "I Want You" – Savage Garden
 "Ooh Aah... Just a Little Bit" – Gina G
 "Get Down on It" – Peter Andre featuring Past to Present
 "Apple Eyes" – Swoop

Other hits
Songs which peaked at number two were "Boom Boom Boom" by The Outhere Brothers, "One Sweet Day" by Mariah Carey and Boyz II Men, "Be My Lover" by La Bouche, "Missing" by Everything but the Girl, "Father and Son" by Boyzone, "X-Files Theme" by Triple X, "Nobody Knows" by The Tony Rich Project, "Theme from Mission: Impossible" by Adam Clayton and Larry Mullen, "Return of the Mack" by Mark Morrison, "Macarena" by Los del Mar, "Hero of the Day" by Metallica, "You're Makin' Me High" by Toni Braxton, "I Love You Always Forever" by Donna Lewis, "What's Love Got to Do with It" by Warren G featuring Adina Howard, and "Where Do You Go" by No Mercy.

Songs which peaked at number three were "Give Me One Reason" by Tracy Chapman, "Breakfast at Tiffany's" by Deep Blue Something, "Have a Little Faith" by John Farnham, "Spaceman" by Babylon Zoo, "Ironic" by Alanis Morissette, "Just a Girl" by No Doubt, and "I'll Be There for You" by The Rembrandts.

Other major hits (with peak positions noted) included "I Want You" (4) by Savage Garden, "California Love" (4) by 2Pac featuring Dr. Dre and Roger Troutman, "Sometimes When We Touch" (5) by Newton, "Ooh Aah... Just a Little Bit" (5) by Gina G, "Children" (5) by Robert Miles, "Mother Mother" (5) by Tracy Bonham, "Glycerine" (5) by Bush, "It's Oh So Quiet" (6) by Björk, "Diggin' on You" (6) by TLC, "That Girl" (7) by Maxi Priest with Shaggy, "Let's Make a Night to Remember" (7) by Bryan Adams, "Blue" (10) by LeAnn Rimes and "Lump" (11) by The Presidents of the United States of America.

Hits by Australasian artists also included "Get Down on It" (5) by Peter Andre, "Apple Eyes" (9) by Swoop, "Lover Lover" (6) by Jimmy Barnes, "Have a Little Faith (In Us)" (3) by John Farnham, and "Wishes" (6) by Human Nature.

1997

Top 5 singles by Australian and New Zealand artists
 "Truly Madly Deeply" – Savage Garden
 "To the Moon and Back" – Savage Garden
 "Freak" – Silverchair
 "Every Time You Cry" – John Farnham and Human Nature
 "Burn" – Tina Arena

Other hits
Songs which peaked at number two were "Break My Stride" by Unique II, "I Finally Found Someone" by Barbra Streisand and Bryan Adams, "Breathe" by The Prodigy, "Last Night" by Az Yet, "2 Become 1" by Spice Girls, "Your Woman" by White Town, "When I Die" by No Mercy, "Burn" by Tina Arena, "Bitch" by Meredith Brooks, and "Where's the Love" and "I Will Come to You" by Hanson.

Songs which peaked at number three were "Discothèque" by U2, "Pony" by Ginuwine, "Don't Let Go (Love)" by En Vogue, "One More Time" by Real McCoy, "You Were Meant for Me" by Jewel, "When Doves Cry" by Quindon Tarver, "How Do I Live" by Trisha Yearwood, "Every Time You Cry" by John Farnham and Human Nature, "Do Ya Think I'm Sexy?" by N-Trance, and "Everybody (Backstreet's Back)" by Backstreet Boys.

Other major hits (with peak positions noted) included "Even When I'm Sleeping" (4) by Leonardo's Bride, "Everybody (Backstreet's Back)" (4) by Backstreet Boys, "Song 2" (4) by Blur, "How Come, How Long" (5) by Babyface featuring Stevie Wonder, "Blood on the Dance Floor" (5) by Michael Jackson, "Sexy Eyes" (6) by Whigfield, "Alone" (6) by the Bee Gees, "Don't Cry for Me Argentina" (7) by Madonna, "Honey" (8) by Mariah Carey, "Semi-Charmed Life" (8) by Third Eye Blind, "Got 'til It's Gone" (10) by Janet Jackson featuring Q-Tip and Joni Mitchell, "The End Is the Beginning Is the End" (10) by The Smashing Pumpkins, "Mo Money Mo Problems" (10) by The Notorious B.I.G. featuring Puff Daddy and Mase and "Lovefool" (11) by The Cardigans.

Hits by Australasian artists also included "Break Me Shake Me" (7) by Savage Garden, "Don't Say Goodbye" (8) by Human Nature, "Abuse Me" (9) and "Cemetery" (5) by Silverchair, "Calypso" (13) by Spiderbait, "All I Wanna Do" (11) by Dannii Minogue and "Did It Again" (15) by Kylie Minogue.

1998

Top 5 singles by Australian and New Zealand artists
 "Second Solution"/"Prisoner of Society" – The Living End
 "Buses and Trains" – Bachelor Girl
 "Torn" – Natalie Imbruglia
 "Big Mistake" – Natalie Imbruglia
 "Sway" – Bic Runga

Other hits
Songs which peaked at number two were "As Long as You Love Me" by Backstreet Boys, "Torn" by Natalie Imbruglia, "Fuel" by Metallica, "Ghetto Supastar (That Is What You Are)" by Pras Michel featuring Ol' Dirty Bastard and introducing Mýa, "When the Lights Go Out" by Five, "Viva Forever" by Spice Girls, "Good Riddance (Time of Your Life)"/"Redundant" by Green Day, and "From This Moment On" by Shania Twain.

Songs which peaked at number three were "Lollipop (Candyman)" by Aqua, "The Boy Is Mine" by Brandy and Monica, "If You Could Read My Mind" by Stars on 54, and "Finally Found" by Honeyz.

Other major hits (with peak positions noted) included "Second Solution"/"Prisoner of Society" (4) by The Living End, "Together Again" (4) by Janet Jackson, "All I Have to Give" (4) by Backstreet Boys, "Music Sounds Better with You" (4) by Stardust, "Buses and Trains" (4) by Bachelor Girl, "Last Thing on My Mind" (5) by Steps, "Stop" (5) by Spice Girls, "Frozen" (5) by Madonna, "Under the Bridge"/"Lady Marmalade" (5) by All Saints, "Ray of Light" (6) by Madonna, "You Make Me Wanna..." (6) by Usher, "Everybody Get Up" (6) by Five, "Gettin' Jiggy wit It" (6) by Will Smith, "Big Mistake" (6) by Natalie Imbruglia, "This Is How We Party" (7) by S.O.A.P., "Walkin' on the Sun" (7) by Smash Mouth, "Life" (8) by Des'ree, "Crush on You" (9) by Aaron Carter and "I'll Never Break Your Heart" (10) by the Backstreet Boys.

Hits by Australasian artists also included "Pash" (10) by Kate Ceberano, "Polyester Girl" (14) by Regurgitator, "Cruel" (14) by Human Nature, "The Things I Love in You" (10) by Cold Chisel, Pushing Buttons (EP) (13) by Grinspoon, "I Don't Like It" (10) by Pauline Pantsdown, "Now I Can Dance" (13) by Tina Arena, "Cry" (13) by The Mavis's and "Addicted to Bass" (15) by Josh Abrahams and Amiel Daemion.

1999

Top 5 singles by Australian and New Zealand artists
 "Don't Call Me Baby" – Madison Avenue
 "The Animal Song" – Savage Garden
 "I Knew I Loved You" – Savage Garden
 "Absolutely Everybody" – Vanessa Amorosi
 "Jackie" – B.Z. featuring Joanne

Other hits
Songs which peaked at number two were "That Don't Impress Me Much" by Shania Twain, "Why Don't You Get a Job?" by The Offspring, "We Like to Party" and "Boom, Boom, Boom, Boom!!" by Vengaboys, "I Want It That Way" by Backstreet Boys, "Sometimes" by Britney Spears, "If Ya Gettin' Down" by Five, "Genie in a Bottle" by Christina Aguilera, "Don't Call Me Baby" by Madison Avenue, and "The Millennium Prayer" by Cliff Richard.

Songs which peaked at number three were "Goodbye" by Spice Girls, "Jackie" by B.Z. featuring Joanne, "Anthem for the Year 2000" by Silverchair, "The Animal Song" by Savage Garden, "Look at Me" by Geri Halliwell, "Larger than Life" by Backstreet Boys, "When You Say Nothing at All" by Ronan Keating, "Unpretty" by TLC, "Bring It All Back" by S Club 7, and "Sister" by Sister 2 Sister.

Other major hits (with peak positions noted) included "When You're Gone" (4) by Bryan Adams and Melanie C, "I Knew I Loved You" (4) by Savage Garden, "Livin' la Vida Loca" (4) by Ricky Martin, "2 Times" (4) by Ann Lee, "This Kiss" (4) by Faith Hill, "All Star" (4) by Smash Mouth, "Touch It" (5) by Monifah, "No Matter What" (5) by Boyzone, "Absolutely Everybody" (5) by Vanessa Amorosi, "Lullaby" (5) by Shawn Mullins, "Beautiful Stranger" (5) by Madonna, "Sweet Like Chocolate" (6) by Shanks & Bigfoot, "Honey to the Bee" (6) by Billie Piper, "Silence" (6) by Delerium featuring Sarah McLachlan,  "(7) "Changes"  by 2Pac, "Got the Feelin'" (6) and Until the Time Is Through" (8) by Five, "Doo Wop (That Thing)" (8) by Lauryn Hill, "Wild Wild West" (8) by Will Smith featuring Dru Hill and Kool Moe Dee, "Fly Away" (8) by Lenny Kravitz, "Thank ABBA for the Music" (9) by B*Witched, Steps, Cleopatra, Tina Cousins and Billie Piper and "Heartbreaker" (10) by Mariah Carey featuring Jay-Z.

Hits by Australasian artists also included "Sister" (3) by Sister2Sister, "Weir" (6) by Killing Heidi, "Eternal Flame"/"Shake You Outta My Head" (8), "Don't Cry" (5) and "Last to Know" (14) by Human Nature, "Have a Look" (13) by Vanessa Amorosi and "Everywhere You Go" (15) by Taxiride.

See also
Music of Australia
List of UK Singles Chart number ones of the 1990s
List of Billboard number-one singles
List of number-one singles from the 1990s (New Zealand)
List of artists who reached number one on the Australian singles chart

Notes

References

1990s
Australia Singles
1990s in Australian music